Anthropology of the Middle East is a biannual peer-reviewed academic journal published by Berghahn Books. It focuses on Middle Eastern culture and its contribution to the world. It is edited by Soheila Shahshahani (Shahid Beheshti University).

Abstracting and indexing 
The journal is abstracted and indexed in:

External links 
 

Berghahn Books academic journals
Biannual journals
Anthropology journals
Publications established in 2008
English-language journals